Ledebouria minima is a species of bulbous flowering plant in the family Asparagaceae, native to South Africa.

Description
The leaves of Ledebouria ovalifolia are small (shorter than the inflorescence), thin, linear in shape, and pointing upwards or spreading. 
They often have purple-coloured bands near the base of the leaf.  

The flowers are stellate in shape, and are born on a long inflorescence.

References

minima
Flora of South Africa